An election to Kilkenny County Council took place on 23 May 2014 as part of that year's Irish local elections. 24 councillors were elected from three electoral divisions by PR-STV voting for a five-year term of office, a reduction of 2 seats from the previous election in 2009. In addition the Kilkenny Borough Council was abolished.

Fianna Fáil became the largest party after the elections securing 10 Council seats, a gain of 3. Fine Gael, by contrast, had a very poor set of results and lost 5 of their Council seats returning with 7 seats in all. Sinn Féin broke through in the county winning 3 seats, while Labour retained just 2 seats on the Council. Malcolm Noonan of the Greens was re-elected in Kilkenny city and Independents secured the final seat.

Results by party

Results by Electoral Area

Castlecomer

Kilkenny City-East

Kilkenny City-West

Piltown

References

Changes since 2014
† On 31 March 2015 Kilkenny City-West Fianna Fáil Cllr Patrick McKee defected to the Renua party. 
†† Kilkenny City-West Sinn Féin Cllr Kathleen Funchion was elected to the Dáil as a TD for Carlow-Kilkenny at the Irish general election, 2016. Her partner, Sean Tyrrell, was co-opted to fill the vacancy on 21 March 2016.
††† Piltown Sinn Féin Councillor Melissa O'Neill was expelled from the party on 7 December 2016 and now sits as an Independent.

External links
 Kilkenny County Council

2014 Irish local elections
2014